Handong Global University (Korean: 한동대학교, Hanja: 韓東大學校) is a private evagelical four-year university located in Pohang, North Gyeongsang, South Korea.

Overview 
The student body numbers about 4,000, from more than 30 different countries and international programs, both available at graduate level.

Undergraduate programs are organized under twelve schools:

While the university offers about 40% of its courses in English in any given semester, the majors that English speaking foreign students can pursue are:
 Information Technology,
 Global Management and Business,
 US and International Law, 
 Psychology and Counseling, and
 Korean Studies

To graduate, a student must complete 130 credits, including 66 credits for majors, 27 credits of basic general studies, 20 credits of global general studies, 12 credits of Korean language, 17 credits of optional courses. And 6 semesters of chapel attendance, mandatory courses in leadership training, and social services are included in basic general studies category.

History
The university was founded in December 1994. The founder, Song Tae-Hun, was an owner of a medium-sized company, and donated land and funds to establish a Christian university. He invited Dr. Kim Young-Gil to be the first president. Dr. Kim was a Christian leader, and had formerly worked as a research scientist at NASA and also as a professor at Korea Advanced Institute of Science and Technology (KAIST).

The university faced many challenges in the beginning. The founder's company went bankrupt while President Kim was recruiting the first professors and students. The university also met local opposition from Pohang citizens who expected the university to serve primarily Pohang residents. When it became known that the university would be a Christian university, recruiting students from all over Korea, many Pohang residents opposed the establishment of the university. This led to lawsuits, and in one of these suits, President Kim was accused of having used government subsidies for purposes which had not been officially approved. He was acquitted and freed after spending 56 days in prison.

Due to the shortage of finances, the university faced many crises of bankruptcy. President Kim and the vice-president visited churches and met Christians both in Korea and abroad to ask for donations. The pastor of Onnuri Community Church (Seoul) became the chairman of the Handong University board, which helped to establish a long relationship between the two institutions. President Kim himself donated his severance pay from KAIST. Many professors worked without payment for several months. Evaluated by the Ministry of Education as reformative in education, Handong won government educational projects, and the university was financially able to operate.

With computer courses and English courses, the university became popular among recruiters of large corporations. In 2007, Handong University joined the University Twinning and Networking (UNITWIN) program, an initiative of UNESCO. The university was selected as an “Advanced College Education (ACE)” institution by the Korean Ministry of Education in 2010 and 2011.  Building on its work with UNITWIN, it was also nominated as one of the 10 United Nations Academic Impact (UNAI) hub universities in 2010. As the UNAI global hub for capacity-building in higher education, the university broke ground in 2017 for the Ban Ki-moon Global Education Institute (GEI).

In 2014, Dr. Chang Soon-Heung was inaugurated as the second president of Handong Global University. After President Chang assumed office, he announced new primary objectives for the university, framed as “Ten World-Changing Projects,”.

Financial aid 
Handong Global University provides academic grants and scholarships for students coming from developing countries or social-economic backgrounds that may pose an obstacle to higher education. Many sponsors have established scholarship funds to assist students. International students may apply for full or partial scholarship grants.

Through Handong Development Foundation, the school provides scholarships to students, most of which are limited or partnered with other funding institutions. In addition, the university offers scholarships based on academic merit and financial need for local Korean students.

Faculty 
Most faculty hold terminal degrees in their fields of instruction. To teach foreign languages, the university has recruited international faculty members who are native speakers of English and Chinese. Faculty who teach at Handong are all professing Christians who have signed their adherence to the university's Statement of Faith, which can be found on the university's website.

International law school 

There is a graduate school of international law school that establishes courses to acquire US lawyer license. This is unique in Korea. Many lawyers are active.

Handong International Law School (HILS) was founded in 2002.

Their Academic Programs are as follows: 
J.D. (Three years: English study of US and International Law)
M.A (Two years: International Legal Studies)

Location 

Covering approximately 200 acres (0.81 km2), Handong is located in Pohang, South Korea. Pohang is a rapidly growing city, currently numbering approximately 500,000 people.

Admission requirements 

Admission to Handong Global University needs competitive academic ability, and applicants are evaluated on three criteria: previous academic performance, an interview, and English proficiency. To be considered for admission, high school students from Korea must have outstanding academic records and the highest score of the National College Entrance Exam. Applicants from outside Korea must meet standards that are equivalent to those of the Korean educational system.

Graduate schools
General Graduate School
Graduate School of Education
Graduate School of Interpretation & Translation
Graduate School of Global Management & Leadership
Graduate School of Counseling
Graduate School of Computer Science
Graduate School of Electrical Engineering
Graduate School of Mechanical Engineering
Handong International Law School (HILS)

References

Handong Global University
Pohang
Educational institutions established in 1995
Association of Christian Universities and Colleges in Asia
1995 establishments in South Korea